Avesso is a white Portuguese wine grape planted primarily in the Minho region of Portugal. It can make full-bodied aromatic wines. Ampelographers believe it may be related to the Portuguese grape Jaen.

Synonyms
Avesso is also known under the synonyms Bornal, Bornao, Borracal Branco, and Borral.

See also
List of Portuguese grape varieties

References

White wine grape varieties